12 in a Box is a 2007 British independent comedy film written and directed by John McKenzie. The film premiered at the 2007 Zurich Film Festival.

Plot 

12 in a Box sees twelve people attend what they think is a school reunion lunch but when they get there they discover that, as part of the last wish of a dead classmate, they will inherit £1,000,000 each if they can all stay together in the house for 96 hours. With one of the participants due to be married and another dropping stone dead on the first day, they have their work cut out to go the distance.

Release 
The film was given a limited European release in 2007 and had its US premiere in Boston in 2009. Despite being a British film with some notable names in the cast, it was not released in the UK until March 2013.

Critical response 

The film received the Audience Award at the 2007 Zurich Film Festival, Indie Spirit Best Storyline Award at the 2009 Boston International Film Festival and the Best Film Award at the 2009 LA British Film Festival. The LA Campus Circle graded the film A− and called it "smart, funny and surprising without being pretentious or hackneyed. There are few dull moments, and it actually succeeds in pulling off the twists."  The film was also praised by The Film Review and CineVue. The Guardian, however, gave it a poor review, as did the Radio Times and the Daily Express.

Criticism

The DVD was released in 2013  marketed under Miranda Hart's name due to her fame; Hart only makes a brief appearance, however, and her screen time is only 5 minutes.

References

External links 

 
 

British comedy films
2007 comedy films
2007 films
2000s English-language films
2000s British films